This is a list of films which have placed number one at the weekend box office in Italy during 2009.

See also
List of Italian films - Italian films by year

Notes
All the films are North American or British productions, except when stated differently.

References
 Note: Click on the relevant weekend to view specifics.

2009
Italy
Box